Live in London is a 1989 album released by British rock group The Only Ones on Skyclad Records in the US, and (entitled Live) on Mau Mau Records in the UK. Although the liner notes suggest it is a live recording of a show in June 1977 at The Speakeasy, Margaret St. in London, it was actually recorded 9–10 May 1980 at the Electric Ballroom in Camden. The UK vinyl release has two less tracks.

Track listing
All tracks composed by Peter Perrett

Side 1
 "Trouble in the World"
 "Programme"
 "The Beast"
 "The Happy Pilgrim"
 "Lovers of Today"
 "Strange Mouth"
 "Why Don't You Kill Yourself"

Side 2
 "No Peace for the Wicked"
 "As My Wife Says"	
 "Miles from Nowhere"
 "The Big Sleep"		
 "Another Girl, Another Planet" 		
 "City of Fun"		
 "Me and My Shadow"

UK vinyl track listing

Side 1
 "Trouble in the World"
 "Programme"
 "The Beast"
 "Lovers of Today"
 "Why Don't You Kill Yourself"
 "No Peace for the Wicked"
 "As My Wife Says"

Side 2
 "Miles from Nowhere"
 "The Big Sleep"		
 "Another Girl, Another Planet" 		
 "City of Fun"		
 "Me and My Shadow"

Personnel
The Only Ones
Peter Perrett - lead vocals, guitar
Alan Mair - bass
John Perry - guitar
Mike Kellie - drums

References

The Only Ones albums
1989 live albums